Cytaea is a genus of spiders in the family Salticidae (jumping spiders).

Cytaea is also the Roman name of an ancient Colchic city, modern-day Kutaisi in Georgia.

Species

 Cytaea aeneomicans Simon, 1902 – Lombok
 Cytaea albichelis Strand, 1911 – Kei Islands
 Cytaea albolimbata Simon, 1888 – Andaman Islands
 Cytaea argentosa (Thorell, 1881) – New Guinea
 Cytaea barbatissima (Keyserling, 1881) – Queensland, New South Wales
 Cytaea carolinensis Berry, Beatty & Prószyński, 1998 – Caroline Islands
 Cytaea catella (Thorell, 1891) – New Guinea
 Cytaea clarovittata (Keyserling, 1881) – New South Wales
 Cytaea dispalans (Thorell, 1892) – Java
 Cytaea fibula Berland, 1938 – New Hebrides
 Cytaea flavolineata Berland, 1938 – New Hebrides
 Cytaea frontaligera (Thorell, 1881) – New Guinea, Queensland
 Cytaea guentheri Thorell, 1895 – Burma
 Cytaea haematica Simon, 1902 – Java
 Cytaea haematicoides Strand, 1911 – Aru Islands
 Cytaea koronivia Berry, Beatty & Prószyński, 1998 – Fiji
 Cytaea laodamia Hogg, 1918 – New Guinea
 Cytaea laticeps (Thorell, 1878) – Amboina
 Cytaea lepida Kulczyński, 1910 – Solomon Islands
 Cytaea levii Peng & Li, 2002 – Taiwan
 Cytaea mitellata (Thorell, 1881) – New Guinea
 Cytaea morrisoni Dunn, 1951 – Western Australia
 Cytaea nausori Berry, Beatty & Prószyński, 1998 – Fiji
 Cytaea nigriventris (Keyserling, 1881) – Queensland
 Cytaea nimbata (Thorell, 1881) – New Guinea
 Cytaea oreophila Simon, 1902 – Java, Sumatra
 Cytaea piscula (L. Koch, 1867) – New South Wales, Samoa
 Cytaea piscula subsiliens (Kulczyński, 1910) – Samoa, New South Wales
 Cytaea plumbeiventris (Keyserling, 1881) – New Guinea, Queensland
 Cytaea ponapensis Berry, Beatty & Prószyński, 1998 – Caroline Islands
 Cytaea rai Berry, Beatty & Prószyński, 1998 – Caroline Islands
 Cytaea rubra (Walckenaer, 1837) – New Guinea
 Cytaea severa (Thorell, 1881) – Queensland
 Cytaea sinuata (Doleschall, 1859) – Philippines to Australia
 Cytaea sylvia Hogg, 1915 – New Guinea
 Cytaea taveuniensis Patoleta & Gardzińska, 2010 – Fiji
 Cytaea trispinifera Marples, 1955 – Samoa
 Cytaea vitiensis Berry, Beatty & Prószyński, 1998 – Fiji

References

 
Salticidae genera
Spiders of Asia
Spiders of Australia
Spiders of Oceania
Taxa named by Eugen von Keyserling